Fred Perlini (born April 12, 1962) is a Canadian former professional ice hockey centre. He was selected by the Toronto Maple Leafs of the National Hockey League (NHL) in the eighth round (158th overall) of the 1980 NHL Entry Draft, for whom he eventually played eight games between 1981 and 1984. The rest of his career, which lasted form 1981 to 1996, was spent in the United Kingdom's lower levels.

Playing career
Perlini played minor ice hockey for his home town Sault Ste. Marie Legion of the OMHA. He played in the 1975 Quebec International Pee-Wee Hockey Tournament with Sault Ste. Marie. In 1978, he scored 107 points in just 27 games for his minor team. 

He later played junior ice hockey in the Ontario Hockey League (OHL) to play for the Toronto Marlboros where he played for three years, accumulating more than 200 points in just 170 games. In 1981 Perlini scored a hat-trick for the Toronto Marlboros one afternoon, and also played and scored for the Toronto Maple Leafs on the same day.

Perlini only made eight appearances in the NHL, all with the Maple Leafs, scoring two goals and adding three assists. He took part in six Maple Leafs training camps as well as one with the Pittsburgh Penguins and one with the New York Rangers.

Perlini played for four years in the American Hockey League (AHL) for the St. Catharines Saints and Baltimore Skipjacks, where he notched up an impressive 140 points.

In 1986 Perlini moved to the United Kingdom to play for the Nottingham Panthers of the British Hockey League (BHL), where he spent just one season scoring an incredible 171 points in just 35 games. He continued in this rich goal-scoring form with two more consecutive 170 point seasons for the Fife Flyers and Deeside Dragons scoring 103 goals in each of those seasons. He went on to play seven more seasons in the British leagues for Trafford Metros, Blackburn Hawks, Streatham Redskins, Basingstoke Beavers, Lee Valley Lions and finally playing three seasons for the Guildford Flames. Perlini scored more than 1400 points in British league games.

During the 2000–01 season, his jersey number 11 shirt retired by the Guildford Flames for outstanding contribution to Guildford ice hockey while playing as well as contributions off the ice to the community and junior programs.

Post-playing career
After finishing his career in Guildford in 1996, Perlini was appointed as Head of Junior Hockey, where he remained until September 2007 when he and his family returned home to Canada.

In that time he coached the Guildford U10s, U12s, U14s, U16s and U19s to Southern Division Titles on various occasions.

Family
His oldest son, Brett (born June 14, 1990), plays professional hockey with Fred's old club the Nottingham Panthers of the EIHL. Younger son Brendan was drafted in the first round (12th overall) of the 2014 NHL draft by the Arizona Coyotes, and currently plays for the Edmonton Oilers of the National Hockey League.

Career statistics

Regular season and playoffs

References

External links
 
 Guildford Junior Ice Hockey Club

1962 births
Living people
Baltimore Skipjacks players
Basingstoke Beavers players
Canadian expatriate ice hockey players in England
Canadian expatriate ice hockey players in Scotland
Canadian expatriate ice hockey players in the United States
Canadian expatriate ice hockey players in Wales
Canadian ice hockey centres
Fife Flyers players
Guildford Flames players
Ice hockey people from Ontario
Nottingham Panthers players
Sportspeople from Sault Ste. Marie, Ontario
Telford Tigers players
Toronto Maple Leafs draft picks
Toronto Maple Leafs players
Toronto Marlboros players
Trafford Metros players